Pelargoderus trigonalis is a species of beetle in the family Cerambycidae. It is known from Heyden in 1897.

References

trigonalis